The 12043 / 44 New Delhi–Moga Shatabdi Express was a Superfast Express train of the Shatabdi Express category belonging to Indian Railways – Northern Railway zone that ran between  and  in India.

It operated as train number 12043 from New Delhi to Moga and as train number 12044 in the reverse direction, serving the states of Delhi, Haryana & Punjab. It was replaced by 22485/86 New Delhi–Moga Intercity Express.

Coaches
The 12043 / 44 New Delhi–Moga Shatabdi Express had 1 AC First Class, 10 AC Chair Car & 2 End-on Generator coaches. It did not carry a pantry car but being a Shatabdi category train, catering was arranged on board the train.

As is customary with most train services in India, coach composition may be amended at the discretion of Indian Railways depending on demand.

Service
The 12043 New Delhi–Moga Shatabdi Express covered the distance of 398 kilometres in 07 hours 05 mins (56.19 km/hr) & in 07 hours 10 mins as 12044 Moga New Delhi Shatabdi Express (55.53 km/hr).

Rake sharing
The New Delhi–Moga Shatabdi Express shared its rake with 12037 / 38 New Delhi–Ludhiana Shatabdi Express.

Routing
The 12043 / 44 New Delhi–Moga Shatabdi Express ran from New Delhi via Rohtak Junction,  to Moga.

Being a Shatabdi-class train, it returned to its originating station New Delhi at the end of the day.

Loco link
As the route was yet to be electrified, a Tughlakabad-based WDP-4 powered the train for its entire journey.

Timings
12043 New Delhi–Moga Shatabdi Express leaved New Delhi every Monday & Saturday and reached Moga the same day.
12044 Moga–New Delhi Shatabdi Express leaved Moga every Monday & Saturday and reached New Delhi the same day.

References

External links

Shatabdi Express trains
Rail transport in Delhi
Rail transport in Haryana
Rail transport in Punjab, India
Railway services introduced in 2012
Defunct trains in India